Bordj Menaïel is a commune in Boumerdès Province within Algeria.

It may also refer to: 

 Bordj Menaïel District, a district in Boumerdès Province within Algeria.
 2010 Bordj Menaïel bombing, a terrorist attack in Algeria.